Nicolás Mentxaka is the name of:

Nicolás Mentxaka (footballer, born 1909), Spanish professional footballer, father
Nicolás Mentxaka (footballer, born 1939), Spanish professional footballer, son